The following is a list of mayors of Providence, Rhode Island.

Originally the term for the mayor was one year, from June to June. In 1873, the term was lengthened to January, and then from January to January. In 1913, the term was lengthened to two years, and in January 1967 to four years.

See also
Mayoral elections in Providence, Rhode Island

Sources
 Mayors of the Town of Cumberland  at Cityof.ProvidenceRI.com
 List of mayors (Political Graveyard)

Providence, Rhode Island